Évocateur: The Morton Downey Jr. Movie is a 2012 documentary film that chronicles the history of The Morton Downey Jr. Show  and Downey's influence on "trash TV." The film also looks at Downey's relationship with Al Sharpton and other important 1980s figures, as well as Downey's role as a predecessor for conservative commentators like Glenn Beck and Rush Limbaugh.

Synopsis
Évocateur features interviews with Chris Elliott, Gloria Allred, Sally Jessy Raphael, Alan Dershowitz, Curtis Sliwa, and Richard Bey, among others. Previously unreleased footage reveals Downey's behind-the-scenes fistfights and foibles.

Évocateur also features an interview with Steven Pagones, the white assistant district attorney who was falsely accused of raping black teenager Tawana Brawley in 1988. Pagones discusses how the case and the related TV debates between Downey and Sharpton affected his life.

On July 10, 2015, CNN announced that it had acquired the broadcast rights to the film, and that the network would air it for the first time on August 13. On July 31, the premiere date was pushed back to August 20.

References

External links
 
 
 Trailer

2012 films
2012 documentary films
American independent films
American documentary films
Documentary films about television
Documentary films about entertainers
Documentary films about public opinion
Documentary films about talk show hosts
2010s English-language films
2010s American films